Bour is a khum (commune) of Phnum Proek District in Battambang Province in north-western Cambodia.

Bour was renamed from Chakrei Commune according to the sub-decree no. 153 អនក្រ.បក dated July 7, 2011 by splitting the following 4 villages into Barang Thleak Commune.

 Hong Tuek
 Chakrei
 Tuol
 Chamkar Trab

Villages

References 

Communes of Battambang province
Phnum Proek District